Zindagi is a 1976 Hindi movie produced by Romu Sippy and directed by Ravi Tandon. The film stars Mala Sinha, Sanjeev Kumar, Vinod Mehra, Moushumi Chatterjee, Aruna Irani, Deven Verma, A. K. Hangal, Padmini Kolhapure, Keshto Mukherjee and Iftekhar. The film's music is by Rajesh Roshan. The movie is based on the 1937 movie Make Way for Tomorrow which was also later adapted in 2003 in Hindi as Baghban.

Plot
Raghu Shukla (Sanjeev Kumar) lives with his wife Sarojini (Mala Sinha), sons Naresh (Anil Dhawan) and Ramesh (Rakesh Pandey), an unmarried daughter Seema (Moushumi Chatterjee) and a nephew Prabhu (Deven Varma). Naresh is married to Sudha (Aruna Irani) and Ramesh to Shobha (Alka). Seema stays away for studies in a hostel. When the family learns about Raghu's retirement, they are excited about getting his retirement benefits. When Raghu informs them that he has cleared his debts with this amount and plans to depend on his sons, everyone is disappointed. Naresh informs his plans to shift to Bombay and he can accommodate his mother while Ramesh informs that he can accommodate father. Thus the parents are bound to live separately with the sons. In Bombay, Sarojini's life is confined within the house and is ill-treated. On the other hand, Raghu is dependent on his son's family. After visiting her parents, Seema decides to take an extreme step for their solace and to the surprise of her boyfriend Ajay (Vinod Mehra) and the Shukla family. The rest of the film shows the changes that occur in the Shukla family on account of Seema's extreme step.

Cast
Sanjeev Kumar as Raghu Shukla
Mala Sinha as Sarojini
Moushumi as Seema R. Shukla
Vinod Mehra as Ajay, Seema's friend
Anil Dhawan as Naresh R. Shukla
Aruna Irani as Sudha N. Shukla
Padmini Kolapuri as Guddu N. Shukla
Rakesh Pandey as Ramesh R. Shukla
Alka as Shobha R. Shukla
Deven Varma as Prabhu
A. K. Hangal as Doctor
Leela Mishra as Doctor's wife
Man Mohan as Manjit Verma
Yunus Parvez as Anthony
Brahm Bhardwaj as Sampatlal
Vikas Anand as Man bribing Naresh
Iftikhar as Verma
Kesto Mukherjee as Principal 'Kalu'
Vijay Dutt as Friendly appearance

Crew
Director - Ravi Tandon
Screenplay - Sachin Bhowmick
Dialogue - Sagar Sarhadi
Producer - Romu N. Sippy, V.K. Sood
Production Company - Vikram Movies International
Editor - Waman B. Bhosle, Gurudutt Shirali 
Cinematographer - Anwar Siraj
Art Director - Ajit Banerjee 
Costume and Wardrobe - M. R. Bhutkar, Mohan Pardesi
Choreographer - P. L. Raj
Music Director - Rajesh Roshan
Playback Singers - Kishore Kumar, Lata Mangeshkar

Soundtrack

Awards and nominations 
 1978 Filmfare Awards - Nominated
Best Actor - Sanjeev Kumar

External links 
 

1976 films
Films scored by Rajesh Roshan
1970s Hindi-language films
Indian remakes of American films
Films directed by Ravi Tandon